Merasty is a surname. Notable people with the surname include:

 Angelique Merasty (1924–1996), Canadian artist
 Billy Merasty (born 1960), Canadian actor and writer
 Gary Merasty (born 1964), Canadian politician